Balsam Lake is a man-made lake located by Pharsalia, New York. Fish species present in the lake include tiger muskellunge, largemouth bass, pumpkinseed sunfish, pickerel, and yellow perch. There is access via state owned carry down off County Route 7, 4 miles north of McDonough.

References

Lakes of New York (state)
Lakes of Chenango County, New York